is  the head coach of the Yokohama B-Corsairs in the Japanese B.League.

Head coaching record

|-
| style="text-align:left;"|Yokohama B-Corsairs
| style="text-align:left;"|2015-16
| 52||19||33|||| style="text-align:center;"|10th in Eastern|||-||-||-||
| style="text-align:center;"|-
 
|-
| style="text-align:left;"|Yokohama B-Corsairs
| style="text-align:left;"|2016-17
| 47||15||32|||| style="text-align:center;"|Fired|||-||-||-||
| style="text-align:center;"|-
 
|-

References

1974 births
Living people
Ehime Orange Vikings players
Japanese basketball coaches
Niigata Albirex BB coaches
Niigata Albirex BB players
Ryukyu Golden Kings players
Senshu University alumni
Tokyo Apache players
Yokohama B-Corsairs coaches
Yokohama B-Corsairs players